Alan MacDonald  (c. 1956 – 30 August 2017) was a British production designer. He was best known for his work on The Queen (2006), which earned him nominations for the Art Directors Guild Award for Excellence in Production Design for a Contemporary Film and Best Technical Achievement at the British Independent Film Awards, and for the Rajasthan-set The Best Exotic Marigold Hotel (2012) which earned him a nomination for the Art Directors Guild Award for Excellence in Production Design for a Contemporary Film.

In 2013, he designed the sets for the Academy Award-nominated film Philomena. He had also been a production designer for a number of advertisements for global firms including Coca-Cola, Levi's, Microsoft, Mercedes-Benz and Volkswagen, and was the theatrical designer for Kylie Minogue's 2002 "KylieFever2002" tour.

Filmography 
 Absurd (1989) (short)
 Tunnel of Love (1991) (short)
 Man to Man (1992)
 Remembrance of Things Fast: True Stories Visual Lies (1994; Art Director)
 Love Is the Devil: Study for a Portrait of Francis Bacon (1998)
 Rogue Trader (1998)
 Nora (2000)
 The Jacket (2005)
 Kinky Boots (2005)
 The Queen (2006)
 The Edge of Love (2008)
 Chéri (2009)
 Tamara Drewe (2010)
 The Best Exotic Marigold Hotel (2012)
 Philomena (2013)
 The Best Exotic Marigold Hotel 2 (2015)
 The Program (2015)
 Sing Street  (2016)
 Victoria & Abdul  (2017)
 Mamma Mia! Here We Go Again (2018)

Personal life and death 

He suffered from bipolar disorder. MacDonald died by suicide at his Covent Garden home on 31 August 2017, after spending two weeks as an in-patient at the private Nightingale Hospital at a cost of £20,000. His last two film credits, Victoria & Abdul (2017) and Mamma Mia! Here We Go Again (2018), were dedicated to his memory.

References

External links 
 

1950s births
2017 deaths
British film designers
Year of birth uncertain
People with bipolar disorder